Prostanthera collina is a species of flowering plant in the family Lamiaceae and is endemic to  Queensland.  It is a shrub with white or pale mauve flowers.

Description
The white or pale mauve flowers have purple markings in the throat and borne in leaf axils. The leaves are lance to oblanceolate shaped, slightly wavy, smooth margins, greyish hue and on a short petiole.

Taxonomy and naming
Prostanthera collina was first formally described in 1928 by Karel Domin and the description was published in Bibliotheca Botanica. The specific epithet (collina) means "living on hills".

Distribution
This species is endemic to Queensland with a restricted distribution, it  grows north of Jericho and in the Warrego Range.

References

collina
Flora of Queensland
Lamiales of Australia
Taxa named by Karel Domin
Plants described in 1928